Brandy Alexander is a sweet, brandy-based cocktail.

Brandy Alexander may also refer to:

People 
 Brandi Alexander, American professional wrestler
 Brandi Alexander, Canadian model featured in Canada's Next Top Model, Cycle 1
 Greg Alexander, former Australian rugby league footballer who is known by the nickname "Brandy"

Fictional characters 
 Brandy Alexander, a major character in the 1999 novel Invisible Monsters by Chuck Palahniuk

Music 
 "Brandy Alexander", a song written by Feist and Ron Sexsmith
 Recorded by Feist for her 2007 album The Reminder
 Recorded by Sexsmith for his 2008 album Exit Strategy of the Soul
 "Brandy Alexander", a song by The Walkmen from A Hundred Miles Off